Melaspas is an Balinese ritual cleansing and purification of buildings recently completed or newly reoccupied, including a rumah (home), kantor (office), toko (shop), kandang (stables) and others. Melaspas are carried out by Hindus in Bali, Indonesia. The word melaspas comes from Bali which consists of two words that MLAs and Pas. MLAs means dividing and Pas means to fit in. Melaspas also reflects that buildings are usually made up of two elements, namely wood and Batu (stone). For Balinese Hindus, this ceremony must be carried out and has become a tradition.

Implementation 
Melaspas ceremony classified into three categories ability to hold the ceremony, namely:
 Kanista ceremony held relatively small. 
 Madyaupacara held classified as intermediate.
 The main ceremony held relatively large.

Ngayaban Caru 
 Invite the Buta Kola.
 Provide labaan.
 Expel or return a variety of spirits who were living or inhabiting the building to its original place. And then bring is believed to be the god Hurdle means to deter the presence of spirits -roh bully.

Ngayaban Pamlaspas 
Ngayaban Pamlaspas are usually preceded by:
 Orti speech aimed at building mudra.
 Pairing ulap-ulap in buildings that are adapted to the type of building.
 If the building is a sacred place, the bottom of the building to be placed pedagingan dug hole and on the top is filled with lotus of Emas (gold).
 Pangurip-urip, namely charcoal diulaskan in each building that symbolizes the Tri Murti : Brahma, VishnuIandswara. Many Hindus believe that the building has been established that the spirit of life.
 Ngayaban fitting pamlaspas and also Ngayaban banten ayaban that begins by giving offerings to Sanggah Surya or piece of bamboo towering.
 Ngayaban caru prabot.

Ngeteg-Linggih 
In a sacred place melaspas (palinggih), the ceremony at the level of middle and nistaning main can be executed at once.

References

Hindu rituals
Hinduism in Bali